Peter Stephen Kalikow (born December 1, 1942) is president of H. J. Kalikow & Company, LLC, a New York City-based real estate firm. He is a former chairman of the Metropolitan Transportation Authority (MTA), former commissioner of the Port Authority of New York and New Jersey and past owner and publisher of the New York Post.

Early life
Peter Stephen Kalikow was born on December 1, 1942 and raised in Forest Hills, Queens, the firstborn son of Juliet (née Citrin) and Harold J. Kalikow. 
Peter’s family is Jewish.<ref>[https://books.google.com/books?id=DGn8UMzI--8C&q=kalikow&pg=PA116 We Are Many: Reflections On American Jewish History And Identity By Edward S Shapiro] retrieved April 6, 2013</ref> 

His grandfather Joseph Kalikow emigrated to the United States from Russia in 1899 and began the Kalikow real estate dynasty by developing housing on large tracts of undeveloped farmland in Queens in the 1930s. By the 1950's Joseph and his sons made a small fortune from the post-World War II housing boom having built over 20 six-story apartment buildings.

Career

After graduating from Hofstra University, Kalikow began his career in real estate in 1967. 

His first building was the Park Kensington, completed in 1969 in Great Neck.

In the late 1970 Kalikow befriended Alfred Momo, a former car racing team manager who worked for Jaguar. 
Over a shared passion for elegance and speed the two decided to create a sophisticated high-performance GT car with understated styling, the interior appointments and space of a Jaguar, and the tractability of an American V8 drivetrain. Less than two years later the Momo Mirage was born. 
The concept earned the Mirage a front cover shoot of the December 1971 issue of Road & Track.
Unfortunately the market and economic situation in Italy where the car was being produced, changed dramatically.  Production came to a grinding halt and only a handful examples were built.

In 1973 Kalikow shifted his full attention to real estate. By 1984 Kalikow had built over 10 residential properties, the iconic commercial office building 101 Park Avenue in midtown Manhattan, and acquired several other properties, including one in London. https://www.101park.com 
He famously acquired 195 Broadway in 1983.

In 1988, Kalikow purchased The New York Post from Rupert Murdoch for $37.6 million. In 1993, Kalikow declared bankruptcy and lost the newspaper, which was eventually purchased by Murdoch's News Corporation.

Kalikow served as chairman of the Metropolitan Transportation Authority from March 2001 to October 2007. He was appointed by then-governor George Pataki, and continued his service into the governorship of Eliot Spitzer.

In May 2000, Kalikow was named chairman of the Grand Central Partnership, one of New York City's Business Improvement Districts (BIDs). Kalikow company officers are located in 101 Park Avenue, located near Grand Central Terminal.

Political involvement
Kalikow endorsed Herman Cain in the US presidential election, 2012. When Cain dropped out of the race, it was revealed that his "super PAC", called "Cain Connections," was funded by a single $50,000 donation from Kalikow.

Philanthropy and accolades
In 1982, he was awarded the Israel Peace Medal, Israel's highest civilian award, for his dedication to assisting the nation's development. In November 2008, Kalikow was honored by Consul General of Italy Francesco M. Talo, with the Commendatore in the Order of Merit of the Italian Republic, one of the highest honors bestowed by the Government of Italy.  Kalikow is widely recognized as a cultural ambassador for his economic and philanthropic efforts as they relate to Italy.

Kalikow has sat on the board of trustees of New York-Presbyterian Hospital since 1987. He also received a John Jay Award from Columbia College in 2004.

In 2015, Kalikow, a Hofstra University trustee and alumnus, established the Peter S. Kalikow School of Government, Public Policy and International Affairs at Hofstra with a $12 million gift.  Kalikow has been instrumental in enhancing Hofstra's reputation as one of the preeminent universities with a focus on the American presidency.  Prior to this gift, Kalikow endowed the Peter S. Kalikow Chair in Presidential Studies and the Peter S. Kalikow Center for the Study of the American Presidency.

Personal life
In 1971, he married Mary Typaldos Jacobatos; they have two children, Nicholas Alexander and Kathryn Harold.

Kathryn Harold works with her father at HJ Kalikow and Co LLC.   She is a principal owner and is involved with all aspects of the company’s assets and operations. https://www.101park.com/ownership.php 

Kathryn is named for her grandfather Harold Kalikow  and is the fourth generation in the Kalikow real estate family. 

Nicholas Alexander graduated from Columbia University, after majoring in art history. Nicholas works in the film industry. He started his film company, called Film 101 Productions, after first working for his father in real estate for a short while. He was executive producer for a film The Outdoorsmen: Blood, Sweat and Beers, which showed at the Tribeca Film Festival and aired on Spike TV. In 2004, he made a short film called A Funny Thing Happened at the Quickmart, which also showed at the Tribeca Film Festival. He also directed a film, Concrete Blondes'', which was released in January 2012 .

Kalikow has an extensive car collection, with a particular passion for vintage Ferraris.

References

External links 
 MTA Bio

1942 births
Living people
21st-century American railroad executives
Executives of Metropolitan Transportation Authority (New York)
New York Post people
Hofstra University alumni
Jewish American philanthropists
New York (state) Republicans
Philanthropists from New York (state)
21st-century American Jews